Pigeon Roost Hollow is a valley in McDonald County in the U.S. state of Missouri.

Pigeon Roost Hollow was named for the wild pigeons the valley once contained.

References

Valleys of McDonald County, Missouri
Valleys of Missouri